Virpur (Also known as Birpur) is a village located Mahisagar district in the Indian state of Gujarat,  from Godhra Junction.
It was once a site of pilgrimage for pilgrims who came to pay homage to goddess Zamzar.

The village is thought to be older than 15th Century. The Zafar Khan of Muzaffarid Dynasty declared himself independent king after blessings of Khwaja Mehmood Dariyai Dulha whose Dargah is still a prominent place and having annual celebration.

There are several schools in the village and the presence of students studying technical and engineering subjects has attracted companies to offer on-campus jobs.

Virpur is formally under the state of Balasinor and ruled by Nawab Babikhan,the village Virpur most of community living there is Vaishnav baniya and Muslims.Also it is famous for Muslim pilgrimage place for Driyayi Peer Mela that is arranging once in a year, also there is a Bethak of Gokulnathji (The guru of Pushtimargiya Vaishnav Sampraday) at KdambKhandi near Virpur. Virpur is a beautiful village surrounded by River and Hills and with the best climate during October to March

Edit below overview about Virpur

About Virpur 
Virpur is a Town in Virpur Taluka in mahisagar District of Gujarat State, India. It is located 110 km towards East from District headquarters mahisagar. It is a Taluka headquarter.
Virpur Pin code is 388260 and postal head office is Birpur (Kheda).
Limbarvada (3 km), Ratankuva (3 km), Kasudi (3 km), Baroda (4 km), Panta (4 km) are the nearby Villages to Virpur. Virpur is surrounded by Lunawada Taluka towards East, Malpur Taluka towards North, Khanpur Taluka towards East, Balasinor Taluka towards South .
Lunawada, Modasa, Kapadvanj, Godhra are the nearby Cities to Virpur.
This Place is in the border of the Kheda District and Panch Mahals District. Panch Mahals District Lunawada is East towards this place .

Demographics of Virpur 
Gujarati is the Local Language here.

Politics in Virpur 
BJSH, Bharatiya Janata Party, BJP, INC are the major political parties in this area.

Polling Stations /Booths near Virpur 
1)Veerpur -3
2)Kaslavti
3)Vasadra-2
4)Veerpur -6
5)Veerpur- 1

HOW TO REACH Virpur

By Rail 
There is no railway station near to Virpur in less than 10 km.

Govt Health Centers near Virpur 
1) Govt. Hospital Lulavada, godhra highway road, Govt. Hospital.Lulavada
2) Sunda, Sub Centre Sunda, 
3) CHC Morva(H), CHC Morva(H), Morva(H), -

Hospitals in Virpur,Virpur

Community Health Center VIRPUR 
Virpur; Gujarat 388260; India
0.4 km distance      Detail

Jyoti Clinic(C.N.Patel.) 
Virpur; Gujarat 388260; India
0.6 km distance      Detail

jeevandeep clinic 
Kheroli; Gujarat 388260; India
5.9 km distance      Detail

UNDRA Primary Health Cneter--PHC 
Undra; Gujarat 388270; India
6.2 km distance      Detail
more ..

Petrol Bunks in Virpur,Virpur

Reliance Petrol Pump 
Virpur; Gujarat 388260; India
1.1 km distance      Detail

Sahajanand Filling Station 
Mahisagar; Gujarat 388260; India
1.4 km distance      Detail

Essar Petrol Pump 
Varadhara; Gujarat 388260; India
2.2 km distance      Detail

HP PETROL PUMP - ANAND PETROLEUM 
414/2 Paiki Charangam ahm-jhalod Highway) TAL- Lunawada; Salawada; Gujarat 388270; India
7.9 km distance      Detail
more ..

Colleges in Virpur,Virpur

kamalaben chhabildas sheth arts college 
Virpur; Gujarat 388260; India
0.5 km distance      Detail

K.C.Sheth Arts college 
Virpur; Gujarat 388260; India
0.5 km distance      Detail

Nalanda B. Ed. College 
Manav seva Mandir; opp. Reliance pump; virpur; Kheda; Gujarat 388260; India
1.2 km distance      Detail

SHREE UMIYA EDUCATION TRUST B.ED COLLEGE 
Mahisagar; Gujarat 388260; India
1.7 km distance      Detail
more ..

Schools in Virpur,Virpur

Kumar Shala Ni Same 
Virpur; Gujarat 388260; India
0.1 km distance      Detail

Old Kanya Shala 
Virpur; Gujarat 388260; India
0.2 km distance      Detail

SVMU COLLEGE 
Virpur; Gujarat 388260; India
0.2 km distance      Detail

Desai C M Highschool 
Virpur; Gujarat 388260; India
0.3 km distance      Detail

Prathamik Kanya Shala 
Virpur; Gujarat 388260; India
0.3 km distance      Detail
more ..

Electronic Shops in Virpur,Virpur

UNITED ELECTRONICS & REFERIGRATION 
Virpur; Gujarat 388260; India
0.5 km distance      Detail

Kedar Electronics 
Virpur; Gujarat 388260; India
0.6 km distance      Detail

soha mobile store 
GJ SH 191; Virpur; Gujarat 388260; India
0.6 km distance      Detail
more ..

Super Markets in Virpur,Virpur

Bright Computers 
Virpur; Gujarat 388260; India
0.4 km distance      Detail

Sanjay Mobile 
Bhalada; Gujarat 388270; India
12.9 km distance      Detail

A P M C 
Mahisagar; Gujarat 389230; India
14.8 km distance      Detail
more ..

Local Parks in Virpur,Virpur

Vallabh Vihar 
Virpur; Gujarat 388260; India
0.7 km distance      Detail

ABDULGAFURBHAI's FARM UNDRA 
Undra; Gujarat 388270; India
6.2 km distance      Detail

Shivam Party Plot Pavapur 
Mahisagar; Gujarat 389230; India
13.1 km distance      Detail
more ..

Police Stations near Virpur,Virpur

Virpur Police Station 
Virpur; Gujarat 388260; India
0.7 km distance      Detail

Police Station 
Virpur; Gujarat 388260; India
0.7 km distance      Detail

District Commandant Homeguards; Mahisagar-Lunawada 
Mahisagar; Gujarat 389230; India
16.6 km distance      Detail
more ..

Government Offices near Virpur,Virpur

Gram Panchayat Virpur 
Virpur; Gujarat 388260; India
0.2 km distance      Detail

GSCSC VIRPUR Godown 
Virpur; Gujarat 388260; India
2.2 km distance      Detail

Lalsar Gram Panchayat 
near; Lalsar; Gujarat; India
9.6 km distance      Detail

Places to visit
 Kashikaka Hill (Kashikaka ni Tekri)
 Khodiyar Mata Temple
 Zamzar mata Hill
 Mahaprabhuji Bethak
 Dariyai Dulha Dargah
 Vaijnath Mahadev Temple
 Mukeshwar Mahadev Temple
 Dholeshwar Mahadev Mandir

References

Villages in Mahisagar district